The New Adventures of Vidocq (French: Les nouvelles aventures de Vidocq, German: Die Abenteuer des Monsieur Vidocq) is a historical crime television series which originally ran between 1971 and 1973. It was a co-production between France and West Germany, with shooting taking place partly at the Bavaria Studios in Munich. The main character is based on the life of Eugène François Vidocq, an early nineteenth century criminal turned crime-fighter. A previous series Vidocq had been made in 1967.

Main cast
 Claude Brasseur as François Vidocq
 Danièle Lebrun as  Baronne de Saint-Gely
 Marc Dudicourt as  Flambart
 Jacques Seiler as  Desfossé
 Pierre Pernet as L'acrobate
 Alain MacMoy as Le marquis de Modène
 Walter Buschhoff as Le docteur
 Robert Party as Fouché

References

Bibliography
 Malcolm Anderson. In Thrall to Political Change: Police and Gendarmerie in France. OUP, 2011.
 Jean-Pierre Mattei. Napoléon & le cinéma: un siècle d'images. Editions Alain Piazzola, 1998.

External links
 

1971 German television series debuts
1973 German television series endings
1971 French television series debuts
1973 French television series endings
French-language television shows
German-language television shows
Television series set in the 1810s
Television series set in the 1820s
Television shows set in Paris